Rookwood railway station  is a request stop on the 15 in (381 mm) gauge Perrygrove Railway. The railway was opened in 1996 and is a heritage railway. There is a footpath into the woods around the line from the halt.

A passing loop was laid in September 2011, allowing a 20-minute interval service at busy times. In July 2013 a siding was laid off the loop to allow access to a newly turfed area for "marquee" events.

References

External links
 Official Website

Forest of Dean
Heritage railway stations in Gloucestershire